Pajarito may refer to:

Places
 Pajarito, Boyacá, a town and municipality in the La Libertad Province, Boyacá, Columbia
 Pajarito Plateau, a volcanic plateau in north central New Mexico, United States
 Pajarito Formation, a Mesozoic geologic formation in the New Mexico and Texas, United States

People
 Roberto "Pajarito" Buitrago (born 1937), Colombian road racing cyclist
 Nicasio Pajarito Gonzalez (born 1935), Mexican potter known for his canelo ware

See also
 Pajarito Mountains (disambiguation)
 Pajaritos (disambiguation)